Recurvaria comprobata is a moth of the family Gelechiidae. It is found in Japan, the Russian Far East (Primorye), Korea and China (Gansu, Shaanxi, Jilin).

The larvae feed on Sorbus comixta.

References

Moths described in 1935
Recurvaria
Moths of Asia